Simon Alexander Neil (born 31 August 1979) is a Scottish vocalist, guitarist, and songwriter. He is known for his work in the bands Biffy Clyro, Marmaduke Duke, and also new band with Mike Vennart, Empire State Bastard.

Career

Biffy Clyro 

Born in Irvine, North Ayrshire, Scotland, Simon Neil formed Biffy Clyro in 1995 at 15 years old recruiting Kilmarnock-born Ben Johnston and someone known only as Barry on drums and bass respectively, calling themselves Skrewfish. Barry was soon replaced by James Johnston, Ben's twin brother, and Biffy Clyro was effectively formed. In 1997, the trio moved to Glasgow, where Neil studied Electronics with Music at the University of Glasgow. He also Studied Film and TV for a year before leaving to pursue music full-time. By then, Simon's musical tastes had expanded; In 2000, the band were spotted at the Unsigned Bands stage at T in the Park by a Beggars Banquet representative. Soon after, the band was signed to the independent Beggar's Banquet.

Biffy Clyro have since released nine albums, signed to a major record label, and toured relentlessly. Neil has stated that Biffy Clyro lyrics often come from phrases he writes down in a notebook he keeps by his bed.

Marmaduke Duke 

Neil plays with JP Reid of fellow Ayrshire group Sucioperro in Marmaduke Duke, under the pseudonym "The Atmosphere", which released their first album, The Magnificent Duke, in 2005.

It was announced in late 2008 that the Duke was to make a return in 2009 with the follow-up album and second in the trilogy, Duke Pandemonium.  The first single from the second album, "Kid Gloves" was released on 9 February 2009.

Solo career 

Neil performs under the name ZZC. His debut single, "To the Bone", was used in the BBC's 'Radio 1 Rescores: Drive (curated by Zane Lowe)' project. In 2017, Neil released a 7-minute instrumental track entitled "The Myth" under the ZZC moniker. Two tracks from an unreleased ZZC solo album, "Plead" and "Fever Dream" were released on the 2019 Biffy Clyro soundtrack album Balance, Not Symmetry.

Personal life 

Neil lives in Ayr with his wife Francesca, whom he married at St. Columba Church in Ayr on 5 January 2008. The song "God Only Knows" by The Beach Boys was used for their first dance, and Neil has the song's chorus, "God only knows what I'd be without you", tattooed on his chest.

In 2021, he presented a series of shows on BBC Radio Scotland.

Musical equipment used 
The following is a list of musical equipment used by Simon Neil:

Guitars 
Electric
 Fender Standard Stratocasters – Various different Mexican models, including White, Red, Sunburst (with neck pickup & controls removed), Black, and Metallic Blue.
 Fender 1960 Custom Shop Stratocasters – Fiesta Red, Frost Metallic, Lake Placid Blue, and White.
 Fender 50s Stratocaster Relic
 Fender Telecaster Standard –  USA model, owned by James Johnston, three tone sunburst, can be seen in the music video for "Living is a Problem Because Everything Dies".
 Fender Telecaster '62 Custom – Japanese model, three tone sunburst, can be seen in the music video for "Only One Word Comes to Mind".
 Fender Telecaster Custom 1972 reissue, black. Can be seen in the music video for "Mountains".
 Squier Simon Neil Signature Stratocaster
 Patrick Eggle New York – Red.
 Gretsch White Falcon Used live for the song "Diary of Always" and is seen in the music video for "Folding Stars"
 Gibson ES-335 – used live for "God & Satan"
 Gretsch G2420T – used for music video of "Howl".

Effects pedals 
 BOSS TU-2 Chromatic Tuner
 BOSS MD-2 Distortion
 BOSS MT-2 Metal Zone
 BOSS DD-6 Digital Delay x2
 BOSS LS-2 Line Selector
 Origin Effects Cali76 Compressor

Previous effects pedals 
 BOSS DS-1 Distortion
 BOSS HM-2 Heavy Metal
 Dunlop Cry Baby Wah Wah
 Electro Harmonix Micro POG

Amplifiers 
 Peavey Delta Blues Combo 
 Fender Hot Rod Deville 4x10 Combo
 Marshall 1959SLP Head
 Peavey Classic Head and Peavey Classic 412 Cabinet
 Hayden MoFo 30W tube head with Hayden 4x12
 Fender Super Sonic 100 BLK Head
 Kemper Profiling Amplifier PowerHead

Discography

Biffy Clyro

 Blackened Sky (2002)
 The Vertigo of Bliss (2003)
 Infinity Land (2004)
 Puzzle (2007)
 Only Revolutions (2009)
 Opposites (2013)
 Ellipsis (2016)
 MTV Unplugged: Live at Roundhouse, London (2018)
 Balance, Not Symmetry (2019)
 A Celebration of Endings (2020)
 The Myth of the Happily Ever After (2021)

Marmaduke Duke
 The Magnificent Duke (2005)
 Duke Pandemonium (2009)

Other appearances

References 

1979 births
Biffy Clyro members
Living people
People educated at Prestwick Academy
People from Ayr
People from Irvine, North Ayrshire
Scottish rock guitarists
Scottish male guitarists
21st-century Scottish male singers
Scottish rock singers
Scottish songwriters